Filaret Ivanovich Pakun (December 2, 1912, Chernigov Governorate, Russian Empire — 2002, Saint Petersburg, Russia) was a Soviet Russian painter, a member of the Saint Petersburg Union of Artists (before 1992 — the Leningrad Union of Artists), who lived and worked in Leningrad, regarded as one of the representatives of the Leningrad school of painting. Filaret Pakun most famous for his later work in the genre of the portrait and the nude painted in the style of French Impressionism.

See also

 Fine Art of Leningrad
 Leningrad School of Painting
 List of 20th-century Russian painters
 List of painters of Saint Petersburg Union of Artists
 Saint Petersburg Union of Artists

References

Sources 
 Выставка произведений ленинградских художников 1951 года. Каталог. Л., Лениздат, 1951. C.16.
 Весенняя выставка произведений ленинградских художников 1955 года. Каталог. Л., ЛССХ, 1956. C.14.
 Осенняя выставка произведений ленинградских художников. 1956 года. Каталог. Л., Ленинградский художник, 1958. C.18.
 1917 — 1957. Выставка произведений ленинградских художников. Каталог. Л., Ленинградский художник, 1958. C.24.
 Выставка произведений ленинградских художников 1960 года. Каталог. Л., Художник РСФСР, 1963. C.14.
 Выставка произведений ленинградских художников 1960 года. Каталог. Л., Художник РСФСР, 1961. C.31.
 Выставка произведений ленинградских художников 1961 года. Каталог. Л., Художник РСФСР, 1964. C.30.
 Ленинград. Зональная выставка. Л., Художник РСФСР, 1965. C.39.
 По родной стране. Выставка произведений художников Ленинграда. 50 Летию образования СССР посвящается. Каталог. Л., Художник РСФСР, 1974. C.20.
 Зональная выставка произведений ленинградских художников 1980 года. Каталог. Л., Художник РСФСР, 1983. C.19.
 Справочник членов Ленинградской организации Союза художников РСФСР. Л., Художник РСФСР, 1987. C.98.
 L' École de Leningrad. Catalogue. Paris, Drouot Richelieu, 16 Juin, 1989. P.76-77.
 Matthew Cullerne Bown. A Dictionary of Twentieth Century Russian And Soviet Painters. 1900 — 1980s. London, Izomar Limited, 1998.
 Мы помним… Художники, искусствоведы – участники Великой Отечественной войны. М., Союз художников России, 2000. C.211.
 Sergei V. Ivanov. Unknown Socialist Realism. The Leningrad School. Saint Petersburg, NP-Print Edition, 2007. P.390, 434. , .

1912 births
2002 deaths
Soviet military personnel of World War II
20th-century Russian painters
Russian male painters
Soviet painters
Socialist realist artists
Leningrad School artists
Members of the Leningrad Union of Artists
20th-century Russian male artists